Virgil LeVan Seay (born January 1, 1958) is a former American football wide receiver in the National Football League (NFL) for the Washington Redskins and the Atlanta Falcons. He played college football at Troy State University and was drafted in the tenth round of the 1980 NFL Draft by the Denver Broncos. The highlight of Seay's career was winning the Super Bowl with Hall of Fame coach Joe Gibbs in 1982. He is well known for being a member of the Redskins' "The Fun Bunch". Seay spent several years as an assistant varsity football and track coach at Lake Braddock Secondary School as well as coaching track at Williamsburg Middle School in Arlington, Virginia.

Since 2002, he has been the owner of Virgil Seay Sports and Activities, a sports camp for children. He is also an assistant football coach at George Mason University.

He is married to Claudia (Burroughs) Seay.  They have two daughters: Meghan and Zoie.

References

American football wide receivers
Atlanta Falcons players
East Mississippi Lions football players
Troy Trojans football players
Troy University alumni
Washington Redskins players
Players of American football from Georgia (U.S. state)
People from Moultrie, Georgia
1958 births
Living people